Benjamin Holmes may refer to:

 Benjamin Holmes (Canadian politician) (1794–1865), Lower Canada businessman
 Benjamin Holmes (Missouri politician) (1846–1914), Democratic Mayor of Kansas City
 Ben Holmes (baseball) (1858–1949), American baseball player
 Ben Holmes (1890–1943), American film director
 Ben Holmes (American football)
 Benjamin Holmes (death in absentia) (born 1952)
 Ben Wetzler (born "Benjamin Holmes-Wetzler", born 1991), American professional baseball pitcher for the Miami Marlins